Kowanyama Airport  is an airport located  southeast of Kowanyama, Queensland, Australia. In 2005 the airport received $107,448 for security upgrades.

Airlines and destinations

See also 
 List of airports in Queensland

References

Airports in Queensland